Abdul Hafeez was a Pakistani weapons scientist and radiochemist. Hafeez was one of the early pioneer of Pakistan Ordnance Factories at Wah Cantt who made an extraordinary efforts to build and develop medium and high-tech weapons for Pakistan Armed Forces. Hafeez was also a Pan-Islamist and political analyst who had long criticised British imperialism and influence in Muslim world.

Education and life
Abdul Hafeez received his intermediate education from Aligarh, British India, attending Aligarh Muslim University where he studied double majors, receiving BSc with honours in Chemistry and Mathematics from there. He later completed his MSc in Theoretical Chemistry from there. In 1905, he went to Great Britain on a University Scholarship and attended University of Birmingham. While at University of Birmingham, he studied and research in the field of Explosive materials and Radiochemisrty.

However, he irritated the Birmingham University officials when he published his PhD thesis in the name of Afghanistan's Habibullāh Kalakāni. The University refused to give him the Doctoral Degree. Soon after, Hafeez left Great Britain and moved to Germany where he, then, attended University of Marburg where he was awarded his PhD in Radiochemistry and Explosive Chemistry in 1908. He also specialised in weapon technology and explosive materials from there.

Death
In 1960, Hafeez moved to Austria where he re-joined Steyr Mannlicher. During the time, his Austrian–Pakistani wife was suffering from acute myeloid leukaemia. His wife, Aynmar Rishta Mehrun Nisa, died in 1964. The same year, he suffered a cardial arrest and was immediately taken to hospital where it was announced that he had died. Hafeez and his wife's bodies were taken to Pakistan where they were buried in a Karachi cemetery.

References

External links
Abdul Hafeez
Unsung Weapon Scientist of Pakistan

Aligarh Muslim University alumni
Muhajir people
Pakistani chemists
Pakistan Army civilians
People from Aligarh
1882 births
1964 deaths
Pakistan Movement
Alumni of the University of Birmingham